The FS E.636 is a class of Italian articulated electric locomotives. They were introduced in the course of the 1940s until the 1960s, and have been decommissioned since 2006. They have been one of the most numerous Italian locomotive groups, and have been widely employed during their long career, hauling every type of train, ranging from freight to long range passenger services. Their introduction also saw the employment of some revolutionary (for the time) design concepts, such as the articulated carbody and the three bogies scheme.

History 

The E.636 was designed to overcome the problems shown in the 1930s by both the E.626 multi-purpose and E.326 high-speed locomotives, in order to better handle the increasing railway traffic in Italy.

The E.636 was the first Italian locomotive adopting the Bo-Bo-Bo configuration with chassis divided into two articulated parts pivoting on the central bogie, which is very well suited for the often tortuous lines of Italy and that would have been later repeated on the E.645/646 and E.656 classes. The presence of a great number of wheels was considered important due to the presence of a number of high-slope lines in the Italian railroad network as it increases the adhesion limit, meaning that the locomotive is less prone to wheel slips. Engines were initially the same as E.626. The 32R used a 3 kV catenary but this was soon shown to be inadequate and so were updated and provided with a new hollow axle transmission system.

The locomotive was built in three different series:
1st series (001-108), from 1940 to 1942
2nd series (109-243), from 1952 to 1956
3rd series (244-469), from 1957 to 1962

The first unit entered service in May 1940. Six locomotives were destroyed during World War II. After the war the total number of locomotives was brought to 469, also thanks to the support from the Marshall Plan, and making it one of the most numerous groups of Italian locomotives. All the units were painted with an Auburn livery; this was changed in the 1990s to a white one with green stripes for most trains (XMPR livery).

By 2000s railway standards, E.636s were old and uncomfortable. The original design of the cockpits proved absolutely unfit to modern safety standards: this was shown in an accident in 1996 at Sulmona, where the engine driver died despite the low speed, without being able to leave the cockpit in time. 200 units were therefore rebuilt and stripped of all asbestos.

Starting from the 1990s, E.636s were used mainly for cargo services, save for the more backlog Sicilian lines. Some units were lent to minor Italian railroads. The phasing out of the entire class was completed in May 2006.

Technical details 

E.636 are very simple locomotives. Most functions of the main command circuit are accomplished through various relays and contactors. In case of failure the train driver could easily fix them to at least free the tracks; also, especially in the last years of their service, E.636s were the first locomotives that the new train drivers studied during their training courses, due to their simple working mechanics.

Motors and electrical description 

As most older Italian locomotives, E.636 has a rheostat (formed by 16 cast iron resistors connected in series, for a total resistance of 29 ohms) that needs to be gradually, but as soon as possible, excluded on start-ups, which regulates the current to the six 32R-200 DC traction motors, two per bogie.

The motors can be connected in three combinations: series, series-parallel and parallel; each combination provides a progressively higher voltage to the motors, therefore increasing the current.

Their set-up is the following:

The rheostat (connected in series to the traction motors) is necessary because the DC motor has the intrinsic characteristic of absorbing a current inversely proportional to its rotating speed; at high speeds, it absorbs less current.  This means that on start the current would be very high, because the only resistance encountered would be only the one offered by motors and internal conductors, which is very low (a short circuit, in practice). The rheostat increases the overall resistance when starting the locomotive, lowering the current and allowing a smoother start.

In S-P and P combinations, the rheostat is divided in three branches connected in parallel; this lowers the overall rheostat equivalent resistance to about 3.5 ohm, while in S combination its elements are all connected in series.

Like almost every Italian locomotive with rheostatic regulation since E.626, traction is controlled via a lever (commonly referred to as maniglione) mounted on a support called roncola; this support has several notches, each representing a portion of the rheostat, plus three "end combination" notches and two "transition" positions (a bigger block between the notches).
To accelerate, the driver rotates gradually counterclockwise the lever notch by notch, and in doing so the various rheostat contactors are closed, shunting the resistors and lowering the total rheostat resistance, also allowing more current to the motors; as speed builds up, the counter-electromotive force lowers this current, until the rheostat is no longer necessary: it is, then, totally excluded (obviously if in traction and in an "end combination" notch). This safely allows traction for an indefinite period of time, within certain limits.

When the end combination notches are reached, the driver can then insert the single shunt (one for each combination) or make a transition to the next combination, reintroducing the rheostat which has to be excluded again, for the following combinations until the end of the parallel combination is reached. 
The shunts increase the current into the motors by shunting some motor spires (through a contactor in parallel); this reduces the magnetic flux and, as said, increases the current (since the two are inversely proportional). There are various "shunt levels", depending on the locomotive, as is further explained; usually, there is one per combination. 
It is also important to remove the shunts before making a transition, in order to avoid flashes due to abnormally high currents.

Like some E.626s, E.636 locomotives are not provided with the "CEM" motor combiner (CEM stands for Combinatore Escluditore Motori), a device that, during transitions, rotates, combining the motors accordingly through various contactors.

On E.636, this is achieved through the uses of more delicate spires, so transitions (especially backward ones) need to be very slow and gradual. The optimal moment to pass to the following/preceding combination first/last notches is when the motor ammeter indicates 0 Ampères, which happens when passing over the transition position with the lever (the driver should briefly stop in the middle of the block and pay attention to the ammeter), meaning that the motor contactors are in optimal position and is safe to proceed. Failure in doing this may result in flashes that will damage the contactors.

An important parameter the driver has to consider, especially during rheostatic exclusion, is the current into the traction circuit.

In particular, if he is excluding too fast, a wheel slippage can occur (in this case the use of sanders and reducing throttle can help), and one or more maximum current relays can open when the maximum allowed current value is exceeded.

The locomotive is protected from overly high currents through different kinds of relays:
 General maximum current relay ("RMx");
 Three motor branch maximum current relays ("RMx 1-2, RMx 3-4, RMx 5-6");
 REC (is the electrical system used to provide the 3000 V coaches' electrical heating)  maximum current relay ("RMx REC");

When they open, they also open the main breaker; that cuts the connection to the catenary.

Before the 1970s, the maximum currents for the relays were the following:

Between 1970 and 1980, the previous values changed:

As can be seen, the currents allowed in series are 450 A  in both cases, while in Series-Parallel and Parallel combinations are 350 A and 450 A respectively.

As said, one level of field shunt (percentage of field weakening: 31%) is allowed in each combination; however, some units received 92-250 (used on FS Class E.424) and 32RT-200 type motors which allowed a maximum of 5 levels of field shunts (percentage of field weakening: 65%, 45% on the latters).
These units were later made identical to standard ones again.

Motion transmission 

Units from 001 to 243 mounted Negri-type transmission, except for units  195-198 and 176-183 which had a rubber tampons in place of coil packs and double hollow axle transmission and rubber tampons respectively.

All the following built units had the same transmission type of 176-183 but slightly different.

Different locomotives have received various gear ratios (see "Special Units" for more details):

Auxiliary and pneumatic services 

The motor cooling-fans were activated by two 4.5 kW 3,000 V dedicated motors until unit 201; later units have 1 kW motors identical to the ones used on FS Class E646; they are also used as dynamos to recharge the 24 V batteries (only if line voltage is greater than 1,500 V) used to feed low tension devices (lights, locomotive heating systems, contactors etc.)

Air production on the locomotive was granted by two C38 type compressors; later they were upgraded with the more reliable W242, however, on some units, only one compressor was replaced, leaving one of each type in use on a single locomotive; the C38 produced air until 8 bars in main reservoir tanks were reached, while the W242 from 8 to 9 bars. In fact, on these units, only the W242 was used on normal conditions; the other one only if pressure dropped below 7 bars.

Main-tanks and the 24 V batteries supplies air and current to several systems:

 Braking system, which takes air from the main reservoir tanks and which is generally kept under a pressure of about 5 bar (when brakes aren't unreleased).
 Main breaker (IR), which is the "high voltage switch" that connects the 3 kV of the line to the locomotive. It can be closed only when pressure is greater than 5 bars.
Contactors. They are widely employed on Italian electro-mechanic locomotives, including E.636. They are used in various systems, mainly to insert/exclude the rheostat's resistors; can move only when pressure is greater than 5 bars, and the IR must be closed.
 Horn and  whistle (Tromba and Fischio). The locomotives have two horns and whistles, one above each driving cab. The firsts are activated by a solenoid valve and work only when batteries are inserted and pressure is greater than 5 bars, while the seconds can reach their maximum frequence with pressures of about 4 bars.
 Sand throwers (Sabbiere). As the name suggests, they throw sand on the track, in order to increase adherence. They are to be manually activated by the driver in case of wheel-slip, and work with pressure of about 5 bars.
 Flange oilers (Ungibordo). During the 1970s, in order to conserve the wheel flange, the locomotives have received a DeLimon system that sprays oil via compressed air on regular selectable intervals into the channel between wheel flange and wheel surface of the front wheel.
 First pantograph-raise compressor (Compressore di primo alzamento). This small compressor, feed by the 24 V provided by the batteries is used when first activating the locomotive, when main tanks are empty, to produce enough air to raise the pantograph for the first time.

Originally the locomotive mounted a 7-position L-type Westinghouse brake controller and wheel-type locomotive brake, later replaced by the more common Oerlikon FV4 and RA-M2 levers respectively.

Braking systems 

 

The locomotive has three kinds of brakes:

 Hand brake: manually activated by two wheels in each cab, one for each bogie, which make the brake shoes clamp against the wheel; a total of four out of six axles are braked this way.
 Locomotive air brakes (Freno Diretto or Moderabile): takes air from the main reservoir tanks, bypassing the brake pipe and directly loading the brake cylinders of the locomotive, thus braking it. It is slightly faster than the continuous brake, but brakes the locomotive only; it is not advisable to be used to brake a full, wagon-fitted train, since it can cause a "spring effect".
 Continuous, automatic air brake, used to brake the entire train.

It is a negative-type brake and is called continuous because it extends itself through the entire train, automatic because if brake continuity is no longer present (general pipe breaks), emergency braking is automatically applied.

On units with Breda-type valves and Oerlikon levers the brakes are graduable during braking and releasing; the working principles are the following.

The braking system of the locomotive is formed by an array of components:
 Two kind of tanks, called "auxiliary reservoir" (serbatoio ausiliario) and "command reservoir".
 One or two pipes, running along the train, called "main pipe" (not on every E636 and generally only on passenger stock, freight cars don't have it) and "general pipe" (the actual brake pipe).
 A tap (the controller which is used to graduate braking).
 The brake cylinders.
 The brake rigging.

To brake the train the driver, by moving the brake controller, creates a depression in a particular tank called "", which, through a series of coils creates a connection to the exterior which makes the general pipe to gradually lower its pressure to a value equal to the one present in the aforementioned tank (how fast this happens depends on train length: the longer it is, the slower this procedure will be).
Inside the  the command reservoir pressure "wins" over now lower pipe pressure and thus the piston moves, creating a connection between the braking cylinders and the auxiliary reservoir (fed by the main tanks), which will then send a quantity of air to the brake cylinders proportional to the entity of the depression.

In case of emergency braking, the brake pipe is put to direct communication with outside atmosphere, rapidly dropping pressure, and consequently making the train brake very fastly (though there isn't a variation of braking power: only the braking speed is affected).

Inside the  the brake pipe pressure wins over the command reservoir pressure and so the connection between the brake cylinders and the auxiliary tanks is modified (or cut, depending on the pipe pressure); the brake cylinders unload themselves sending their air outside until their pressure reaches a value proportional to the entity of the depression.

However, on units with Triple Valves (Distributore tipo Westinghouse) and 7-position levers, braking circuit is slightly different. The  is divided in two parts like said before, but there isn't the command reservoir tank: when the pressure inside the brake pipe drops, it's directly the auxiliary reservoir that makes the frame put in the middle moving.  
Braking is not gradual on release in this case: when the driver puts the controller on "release" position, brakes are fully released; if he brakes again too shortly after, there is the risk to have a loss of braking power because there may not be enough air to brake optimally, since the absence of the fixed pressure of the command reservoir doesn't ensure that there is enough air to safely release the brakes. It is even possible to fully exhaust the reservoir, with the consequent danger to not be able to stop the train at all. This is prevented in units with Breda and other types of valves as the brakes cannot be fully released if there is not enough air in main reservoir tanks to brake again.

There is a risk associated to the "overload" operation. 
Inside the  the pressures inside the two chambers are balanced: during the overload both command reservoir and brake pipe pressures rise proportionally. 
As said they are gradually lowered back to  but it may happen that the command reservoir "gets struck" to a higher pressure, while the pipe pressure is lower. This keeps the connection between the auxiliary reservoir and the brake cylinders and consequently the brakes in effect. 
In this occurrence a possible solution is to overload again the system so pressures can be rebalanced, or, if this doesn't work, to manually "reset" the command reservoir (emptying it) by pulling a lever located outside.
On units with seven-position levers the risk is greater: the pipe is put to direct connection with the main tanks and, if the controller is left for too much time in the overload position, it may reach a very high pressure (even ). 
It is very easy for the brakes to remain in effect in this case, and the only practicable solution is to manually empty the command reservoir tanks as said above.

Mechanical modifications 

The locomotive is formed by two half carbodies, pivoting over the central bogie. Between them, there is a bellows, which was originally made with rubber then replaced in the 1950s by an impermeable membrane. In recent years this was further replaced by flexible plastic material.

On post war units,  reinforcement frames have been introduced on the chassis and under the cabs, as the first 108 units showed some mechanical weaknesses in those points;  in the mid-1980s it was decided to reinforce only the chassis on pre-war units (however units 026 an 065 never received these modifications).

To reduce parasite motion, dampers were mounted between the carbodies: glycerine-type from units 1-276 and special-oil type from unit 277 onwards, although these were later eliminated in 1977 because considered useless.

The first 108 units had different rheostat ventilation shafts on the roof than the rest of the units ones, although these were later replaced with the more efficient shafts used on the latter units.

They also had sliding oil-buckles, while following units had rolling bearing ones.

Units 162-171 were equipped with French-derived Athermos buckles for testing purposes, which were later removed.

Sandthrowers were mounted internally into the bogie in the units 001 - 108; after the war they were replaced by external ones that also were natively mounted on later units.

Safety systems 

The first 108 locomotives originally had mounted a vigilance pedal designed by FS engineer Minucciani, that required a periodic acknowledgement from the driver when the train was moving (or emergency braking would have been commanded), but after the war, due to labor union pressures, it was discontinued; however, starting from the 1970s, many (not all) units received "Ripetizione Segnali a 4 codici" system, Hasler speedometer and a modified "speed graph recorder" (Zona tachigrafica), that also recorded the codes received from the RS.

Special and experimental units

 E.636.385 was part of the "PV Train" project and received photovoltaic cells used to recharge the 24 V batteries. Due to this, it has been inserted in the asset of Italian historical units;
 E.636.082 has been used for testing in 1965 of rheostatic braking (the same system was later adopted on FS Class E.444); a second, smaller lever was mounted on the top of the traction lever, and was used to control the braking rheostat. This units also mounted more and bigger vents on its sides. At this time, it has been stripped of many internal components, and is not able to run.
 E.636.284 is maybe the most famous unit of the group. The unit was involved in an accident, where the driving cabin was damaged. FS decided to recover the unit, and also decided to experiment a new type of driving cabin, similar to the ones used on FS Class E.656. The unit is nicknamed "Camilla", originating from which is supposed to be the girlfriend's name of a worker employed in the rebuilding works, who wrote it with chalk near one of the couplers of the locomotive. This unit is also historical.
The results of this experiment had proven successful, as these locomotives had the same performances as FS Class E.428 (gear ratio 31/101), but with less weight and power; however they were later brought back to their original status.
 Units from 271 to 275 were built with different bogies than the standard ones (similar to the ones used on the FS Class E.646 prototypes), 32RT-200 motors, 5 shunt levels and a gear ratio of 24/74 (max speed ). These units were later made identical to standard units.

During the 1960s-1970s Ansaldo-Breda built a locomotive derived from E.636 for use in Yugoslavia, classified JŽ 362.

See also 
 HŽ series 1061

References 
 Istruzione sull'Esercizio del Freno Continuo Automatico
 
 Some parts have been translated from the article present on the Italian Wikipedia.

3000 V DC locomotives
E.636
Bo-Bo-Bo locomotives
Railway locomotives introduced in 1940
Gio. Ansaldo & C. locomotives
Breda locomotives
Reggiane locomotives
Standard gauge locomotives of Italy